Kenneth Parr is an English former professional rugby league footballer who played in the 1960s and 1970s.

Playing career

International honours
Ken Parr won a cap for England while at Warrington in 1968 against Wales, and won a cap for Great Britain while at Warrington in 1968 against France.

County Cup Final appearances
Ken Parr played left-, i.e. number 11, in Rochdale Hornets' 5-16 defeat by Warrington in the 1965 Lancashire County Cup Final during the 1965–66 season at Knowsley Road, St. Helens on Friday 29 October 1965, played left-, i.e. number 11, in Warrington's 2-2 draw with St. Helens in the 1967 Lancashire County Cup Final during the 1967–68 season at Central Park, Wigan on Saturday 7 October 1967, and played right-, i.e. number 12, in the 10-13 defeat by St. Helens in the 1967 Lancashire County Cup Final replay during the 1967–68 season at Station Road, Swinton on Saturday 2 December 1967.

References

External links
Statistics at wolvesplayers.thisiswarrington.co.uk

Living people
England national rugby league team players
English rugby league players
Great Britain national rugby league team players
Place of birth missing (living people)
Rochdale Hornets players
Rugby league second-rows
Warrington Wolves players
Year of birth missing (living people)